Marla Boyd (born Geraldine Marla Boyd on February 25, 1987) is a Filipina actress.

Biography

Career
Marla didn't have plans of entering showbiz when she came to the Philippines for a vacation. But she enjoyed her vacation so much that she wanted to stay.

She found her reason to stay when she learned about Star Circle Quest. She admits that the idea of staying was actually what prompted her to join the talent search show. She joined the first Star Circle Quest where she didn't get picked. After a year Marla joined Star Circle Quest - Star Circle National Teen Quest where she was one of the top 15 contestants.

After getting bumped off the top 15, she received some offers for acting projects from ABS-CBN. Her first major role to star in ABS-CBN's Ikaw Ang Lahat Sa Akin along ABS-CBN's biggest stars.  She played, a villainess out to make Jasmin's (Bea Alonzo) life miserable, Zsa Zsa Ricafort.  The role gave her much notice.  Marla considers this as her biggest break in Philippine showbiz.

Filmography

References

External links 

Living people
Star Magic
Star Circle Quest participants
1987 births